The 1892 Colorado gubernatorial election was held on November 8, 1892. People's Party nominee Davis Hanson Waite defeated Republican nominee Joseph Helm with 46.68% of the vote.

General election

Candidates
Major party candidates
Joseph Helm, Republican
Joseph H. Maupin, Democratic

Other candidates
Davis Hanson Waite, People's
John Hipp, Prohibition

Results

References

1892
Colorado
Gubernatorial